The Crow–Hightower House is a historic house located at 909 Maine Street in Eads, Colorado. It was listed on the National Register of Historic Places on August 20, 2013.

Description and history 
It was deemed significant "for its representation of a circular plan Modern Movement/Novelty style dwelling. The style is reflected in the house's circular plan, conical entrance turret, roof crenelations, contrasting blond and red brick, and innovative interior layout. The house is a relatively rare example of the round form employed in a mid-twentieth century dwelling."

References 

Houses on the National Register of Historic Places in Colorado
Houses completed in 1952
Houses in Kiowa County, Colorado
National Register of Historic Places in Kiowa County, Colorado